Chiajna is a commune in the south-west of Ilfov County, Muntenia, Romania, immediately west of the capital, Bucharest. It is composed of three villages: Chiajna, Dudu and Roșu.

The mayor of Chiajna is currently Mircea Minea (National Liberal Party).

Etymology
Chiajna is a Romanian female name, being a feminine version of "cneaz" (Knyaz).

In one version Chiajna was named after the wife of Cernica Știrbey, a Wallachian vornic who owned the area where people from Cernavodă settled and founded the village.

Another story says that Lady Chiajna (ca. 1525–1588, Istanbul) was the daughter of Petru Rareș, the voievod of Moldavia, an illegitimate child of Ștefan cel Mare. Lady Chiajna was the wife of Wallachian prince Mircea V Ciobanul. In Romanian literature (e.g.: the novella Doamna Chiajna, published in 1860 by author Alexandru Odobescu), she is a famous and frightening female character, similar to Lady Macbeth.

Features of the commune
The commune contains Lady Chiajna High School (Grupul Școlar Doamna Chiajna), with the following specializations: Promotional Design, Football, Yachting, Wrestling, Boxing, and Public Alimentation.

The commune is host to the football team Concordia Chiajna. The team is in Liga II, and plays its home matches on Stadionul Concordia.

Since the 2010s, Chiajna has been the site of new residential developments collectively known as "Militari Residence", which have become notorious for their poor urban planning and construction practices.

References

External links
News and Articles about Chiajna

 
Communes in Ilfov County
Localities in Muntenia